The 1989 Five Nations Championship was the 60th series of the rugby union Five Nations Championship. Including the previous incarnations as the Home Nations and Five Nations, this was the 95th series of the northern hemisphere rugby union championship. Ten matches were played over five weekends between 21 January and 18 March. France won it with three wins and one defeat (against England), while none of the other four teams was able to win the Triple Crown. England entered the final round of matches knowing that a win would give them at least a share of the championship, but were overturned in Cardiff as Wales scored their only victory of the season.

Participants
The teams involved were:

Squads

Table

Results

 This is the first draw in the Five Nations since 1985 (Ireland 15–15 France)
 This is the first draw between England and Scotland since 1982
 England retained the Calcutta Cup

1989
Five Nations
Five Nations
Five Nations
Five Nations
Five Nations
Five Nations
 
Five Nations
Five Nations
Five Nations